Compass Records is an independent record label founded in 1995 by musicians Garry West and Alison Brown that specializes in folk, bluegrass, Celtic, jazz, and acoustic music.

In 2006, Compass purchased the Green Linnet and Xenophile catalogs, and in 2008 the label purchased Mulligan Records. Red House Records, an independent folk and Americana record label founded in 1983 in St. Paul, Minnesota, was purchased by the Compass Records Group in 2017.

Roster

 Altan
 Darol Anger
 Russ Barenberg
 Bearfoot
 Beoga
 Michael Black
 Paul Brady
 Dale Ann Bradley
 Paul Brock
 Paul Carrack
 Liz Carroll
 Beth Nielsen Chapman
 The Chapmans
 Jeff Coffin
 Éamonn Coyne
 A. J. Croce
 Catie Curtis
 Fairport Convention
 Kris Drever
 Elizabeth and the Catapult
 Farmer Not So John
 Mike Farris
 Matt Flinner
 Rebecca Frazier
 Gibson Brothers
 Thea Gilmore
 Grada
 Roddy Hart
 Colin Hay
 The Infamous Stringdusters
 Andy Irvine
 Nuala Kennedy
 Lúnasa
 Claire Lynch
 Mairéad Ní Mhaonaigh
 David Mayfield
 Cathal McConnell
 John McCusker
 Shannon McNally
 Clara Moreno
 Mozaik
 Jeb Loy Nichols
 Old Blind Dogs
 Old Salt Union
 Pierce Pettis
 Todd Phillips
 Noam Pikelny
 Kate Rusby
 Leftover Salmon
 Enda Scahill
 Sharon Shannon
 Frank Solivan
 Tannahill Weavers
 Athena Tergis
 Glenn Tilbrook
 Ciaran Tourish
 Molly Tuttle
 Vigilantes of Love
 The Waifs
 Alicia Witt
 Victor Wooten
 Andrea Zonn

See also
 List of record labels
 Green Linnet Records
 Xenophile Records

References

External links
 
 

American independent record labels
Jazz record labels
Folk record labels
Labels distributed by Warner Music Group
Record labels established in 1995